Pass the Buck is a British game show that aired on ITV from 3 September 1986 to 1987 and hosted by George Layton.  A celebrity special edition was transmitted on Christmas Eve 1986, at 3:10 pm, with Dennis Waterman and Rula Lenska playing Simon Williams  and Lucy Fielding.  The designer was Barry Clark, associate producer Nigel Cook, director Robert Reed and the producer was Malcolm Morris.  It was a Thames Television production, produced in association with Action Time Ltd.

References

External links
 Pass the Buck at BFI
 

1986 British television series debuts
1987 British television series endings
1980s British game shows
ITV game shows
Television shows produced by Thames Television